, also known as Yamibō/Yamibou for short, is a Japanese adult visual novel published in December 2002 by Root. A 13-episode anime series produced by Studio Deen aired between October and December 2003. Although the characters and their relationships remain basically the same in the game and anime, the storyline is different.

Plot

Game
The game begins with a girl who is taken to a strange, magical realm by a dragon. She apparently was taken to the library where all past, present, and future realities are kept within the books. The player is a young man who has come from one of these books as well, but has forgotten his way back home. The player is commissioned to find the missing girl by the denizens of the library, and starts his search by entering different books.

Anime
The story follows the travels of Hazuki Azuma, a tall, brooding high-school girl, as she searches for her adopted older sister and love interest, Hatsumi, in many different "book worlds". After the disappearance of her sister, a talking parakeet nicknamed Ken-chan introduces Hazuki to Lilith, the caretaker of the Great Library. Each book in the library contains a different world, and the guardian of the library takes on the title Yami.

Characters

Hazuki is a very tall, quiet and serious girl, with long dark blue hair and sharp blue eyes. She uses the relatively masculine first person pronoun "boku". She appears to be very popular among girls, with admirers developing crushes on her on many occasions both in school and in several book worlds. Hazuki is cold and unfriendly, but not particularly rude (e.g. throwing away the gift that a female admirer gave her as soon as the girl went out of sight). She is deeply in love and is fiercely protective of Hatsumi, is shown to have been masturbated to the thought of Hatsumi's body and fended off boys trying to approach the girl.

Hatsumi is Hazuki's adopted older sister and love interest. Hatsumi appears to be mute (though it is proven otherwise on several occasions) and communicates mostly through gestures and facial expressions. Despite being older, Hatsumi is much shorter than Hazuki. Although it seems that Hazuki's love is one-sided, episode seven shows that Hatsumi does have feelings for Hazuki and was trying to express herself as best as she could with the knowledge that she cannot stay beyond her sixteenth birthday (suggestions of this were shown along the way by her sending Hazuki anonymous love letters—later expressed in full and in words toward the end of the anime). In the first episode, Hatsumi disappears in a burst of green light ("sōma") at midnight on her sixteenth birthday, as Hazuki tries to steal a kiss in her sleep. The events that follow lead Hazuki to a mysterious library in another dimension, in which all the worlds are kept in books. Hazuki learns from the Library guardian, Lilith, that Hatsumi is only one of the forms of the previous guardian (Eve), and that Eve stays in different books for fun until she turns sixteen.

Lilith is the guardian of the library. She is the third Yami, after Adam, the creator of all the worlds, and Eve. In the anime, Lilith is attracted to Hazuki and flirts relentlessly, though she is always turned down. Lilith appears to dislike Eve and have interest only in her own ends, but her kind and vulnerable sides are sometimes shown, especially when she encounters children in trouble; adults do not seem to move her to compassion as much. Her more childish mannerisms are fairly constant, but Lilith sometimes shows considerable wisdom and knowledge. She claims that Eve left the duty of being Yami and went off to play in the book worlds, and so she wants to find Eve and return her to the library.

Ken is a yellow cockatiel who can talk. In the anime, he accompanies Lilith in her travels, while in the game he accompanies the nameless main character. He speaks in very heavy Kansai-ben. Ken is loud, obnoxious, lecherous and perverted, as well as overly confident and a bit too slow to stay out of trouble. He usually ends up punched, squashed, beaten or otherwise violated, either as a result of tasks given to him by Lilith, or because of his big mouth and perverted tendencies. In the game, his true form is a kendappa and he is working for Arya. He serves as a comic relief in the series.

Arya is a mysterious silver-haired boy who appears in every episode of the anime and during certain times in the game. In the anime he claims to be cleaning up after Hazuki and Lilith. Also, he offers to perform repairs on Tamamonomae's Space Hall. He is always cosplaying as some type of character or animal. At the end of the anime series, he is shown closing a book that seems to contain the world of the Book Keepers. He is the main narrator of the story, and his short exits and introductions are often the only transition between stories.

Kogechibi lives in the library, and looks like a four-inch (102 mm) tall Eve, though with different colored eyes. "Koge" refers to the one-eyed cloak that covers all of her but the eyes. In the game, when the main character is occupying "Koge", the girl is referred to as "O-chibi-chan" ("o" being an honorific and "chan" an endearment). Kogechibi's vocabulary is composed of unintellible sounds akin to baby talk. In the anime, she has a disturbing love of fireworks and can say a few words if they have something to do with explosives. She plays a small part in the plot, but is mostly comic relief in the anime. In the game, it is revealed that the guardians "fragment" when they overexert themselves, and that the fragments take on a life of their own. Kogechibi is a fragment of Eve.

Gargantua appears in episode two of the anime as a madman, with three bumbling demonic henchmen and a servant named Seiren (derived from the Hellenic Siren). His main goal is to find Eve who is present as the mute, magic-using Jill, assistant caretaker of the orphanage. Gargantua is fiercely attached to her, and accidentally stabs her fatally with a knife when he jealously tries to dislodge a fellow orphan, Ritsuko, from Jill's arms. Jill's body disappears in an explosion of souma, drenching the two children in her life force. In the game, Gargantua and the main character both hold and try to acquire more fragments of Eve. For a while, Gargantua takes over Joe Harry and the command of the "hunters" (smaller, one-eyed hat-looking creatures). At the end of the anime, thanks to Eve and Tamamonomae, Gargantua has a change of heart and returns to the realm Lilith gave him for the sacrifice of princess Mariel, taking Ritsuko with him.

Ritsuko is an immortal magic user and appears no older than 25, despite being over a century old. Ritsuko travels the countryside performing healing miracles. She has never forgotten Jill or Gargantua, and carries small portraits of them in her locket. When she comes to the castle to heal Princess Mariel, she is taken in as the court alchemist. While escorting the princess around the village, Ritsuko meets Gargantua, who is also immortal because of Jill's souma and has learned dark magic. He kidnaps Princess Mariel and tries to sacrifice her to Lilith, in order to be shown where Eve is. Ritsuko stops him only too late and is framed for the kidnapping and thrown into a dungeon. Ritsuko is a user of sexual magic in the game, and one of the bodies occupied by the player is under her spell. She has a clone who was made by future herself, which is also seen travelling through the books with two children. At the end of the anime, thanks to some interference by Eve and Tamamonomae, Gargantua returns for Ritsuko, freeing her from her cell and taking her back with him to his own realm.

Milka appears in episode six under the care of Seiren. She is a girl with a cruel past who is trapped in her five-year-old body. Milka lives on an island, and has no one to befriend but Seiren and her white tiger, Rascaless. Her initial caretaker was an older woman who used to whip the child as a punishment for such trivial offences. Eventually, the old woman is killed by Rascaless when Milka is not watching. Initially afraid of Hazuki and Lilith, she warms up to them and has Seiren take them to the villa at the center of the island. In the game, Milka is sent to live on the island by her older brother, for whom she has romantic feelings, because of her poor health. Seiren sings on the cliffs everyday to keep all of Milka's brother's soldiers under her spell, and Milka on the island. After Seiren and Lilith's reconciliation, Milka goes back to her brother with Rascaless.

Fujihime appears in a book-world that corresponds to the samurai era of Japan. Fujihime looks like Hatsumi, but has purple eyes instead of red. Fujihime is not another form of Eve. She is the spirit of a Japanese wisteria (called Fuji) who is gifted power from Eve. She can talk, and possesses the comb with which Hatsumi was using, in modern-day Japan.

Meirin is a cheerful, wily kitsune girl with two tails who is trying to "raise her rank" by getting close to the princess. The player of the game meets Meirin after he enters a body, the previous owner of which she unintentionally kills. To make up for it, she takes him to Fujihime.

Lala is the monolithic AI controlling the spaceship upon which Hazuki and the others find themselves in episode ten. The ship is an "emigration spaceship" taking the former inhabitants of Earth on a search for a new home planet. None of the passengers appear over ten years old, yet they have been drifting for over two hundred years. Hazuki and Lilith discover that all the adults died in a plague nine years ago. Eve appeared in this world as Lular over a hundred years ago, and had vanished on her sixteenth birthday while fixing a malfunctioning part. This futuristic world and its characters do not appear in the game.

Tamaonomae appears to be Meirin's future form as a kitsune woman with nine tails, though she exists in a different world. The world is not book world, it is named Sen-Kai, which is greater than the library. In the anime, she and Meirin may simply be alternative versions of one another; she described Meirin as her "other self", which in context may mean that Meirin is her creation or an independent creature which fissioned off from Tamamonomae. But in another (but same company's) game, she is a really Meirin's future form. Despite her sexual and alcoholic tendencies, is not an unsympathetic character; she has considerable insight into people and does some fairly altruistic things for some of the other characters; she restores Mariel to human form, helps Gargantua to acknowledge the truth, returns the Hat to Eve and finally seems to have taken Gargantua's henchmen in as permanent guests.

Seiren is a beautiful, blue-haired woman who initially appears as Gargantua's ally in the anime. He describes her as a devil, but apparently trusts her, using her aid in his search for Eve. Seiren holds a grudge against Lilith, claiming that she was abandoned by her. She is most upset when they meet again on Milka's island and Lilith does not even remember her.

A woman who appears in a book-world that corresponds to the Russo-Japan War era. She is an intelligence agent and an expert martial artist noted for sending three colleagues into hospital during training. Yōko arrives on a train somewhere corresponding to contemporary Russian Siberia, cross-dressing as a male diplomat and attempting to link up with fellow agent Kohtaro Nanbu, codenamed "Adam", for a film containing radio codes.

A princess in Ritsuko and Gargantua's world. One day, when she is placed under Ritsuko's care, she meets Gargantua and eventually develops a crush on him. She is later kidnapped and sacrificed to Lilith by Gargantua, committing suicide by poison, but is reincarnated and employed as a maid by Tamamonomae.

Adaptations

Manga
There is a one-book manga adaptation, Yami to Bōshi to Hon no Tabibito ~Romance, illustrated by Aya Sakurai. It is a compressed version of the game's events, following the storyline that leads to a romantic relationship between the nameless main character and Lilith.

Anime
A 13-episode anime television series adaptation was produced by Avex mode and Studio Deen and directed by Yūji Yamaguchi, with Tomomi Mochizuki handling series scripts, Asako Nishida designing the characters, Tomochi Kosaka designing the props and Akifumi Tada composing the music. As a UHF anime, it aired in Japan between October 2 and December 25, 2003 on MBS-affiliated networks for 13 episodes. The anime's opening theme is "Hitomi no Naka no Meikyū" by Aiko Kayō and the ending theme is "Eien no Inori o Sasagete" by Sanae Kobayashi. The anime was licensed for release in North America by Anime Works. It will be broadcast on Toku beginning on July 19, 2016.

Although there was frequent mention in the anime's pre-broadcast publicity that "all the characters will appear", copyright-infringing characters, such as Erosuke and the train conductor, as well as some male and non-human characters, did not make an appearance.

Episodes

Video game
It was based on the anime and even uses screencaps from it.

Reception
Theron Martin of Anime News Network called the series a "true oddity" for not being picked up for an English sub by Media Blasters until 2013, but was not released until 2016. He also called the series odd because it does not "resemble anything else out there" as it has its origins in an adult visual novel and noted that the storytelling approach is not linear, with the mechanics for the world-shifting in the series being "an interdimensional library". He said that while the storytelling is strong, some characters appear but are never explored, humor is weak, and criticized the animation style. Even so, he said that the character designs are strong, adding that the series has fan service, the yuri element is not very pervasive, and says that the series has a diverse set of music. He concluded that while watching the series is one that "requires some patience", viewers will "be rewarded" through their time watching the series, making it worth their while.

References

External links
Official visual novel website 
Animax's official website for Yami to Bōshi to Hon no Tabibito 

2002 video games
2003 anime television series debuts
2003 Japanese television series endings
2003 manga
Animax original programming
Anime television series based on video games
Bishōjo games
Eroge
Fantasy anime and manga
Japan-exclusive video games
Japanese LGBT-related television shows
Kadokawa Shoten manga
Mainichi Broadcasting System original programming
Manga based on video games
Seinen manga
Studio Deen
Video games developed in Japan
Visual novels
Windows games
Windows-only games
Yuri (genre) anime and manga
Witchcraft in anime and manga
LGBT speculative fiction television series